Douglas Jackson may refer to:

Douglas Jackson (author) (born 1956), Scottish novelist
Douglas Jackson (businessman) (born 1957), United States-based co-founder of e-gold
Douglas N. Jackson (1929–2004), Canadian psychologist
Douglas S. Jackson (born 1954), Tennessee politician
Doug Jackson (ice hockey) (1924–1980), Canadian ice hockey goaltender
Doug Jackson (musician), American guitarist
Douglas Jackson (filmmaker) (born 1940), Canadian filmmaker
Douglas Jackson (rugby union) (1941–2018), Scottish rugby union player

See also
Charles Douglas Jackson (1902–1964), expert on psychological warfare